Ümit Kurt may refer to:
Ümit Kurt (footballer)
 Ümit Kurt (historian)